Juan Alfonso Valerià y Aloza, O.F.M. or Joan de Santamaríi Alonso i Valeria (1643–1700) was a Roman Catholic prelate who served as 
Bishop of Lérida (1699–1700) and 
Bishop of Solsona (1694–1699).

Biography
Juan Alfonso Valerià y Aloza was born in Terriente, Italy in 1643 and ordained a priest in the Order of Friars Minor.

On 8 February 1694, he was appointed during the papacy of Pope Innocent XII as Bishop of Solsona.
On 14 February 1694, he was consecrated bishop by Gasparo Carpegna, Cardinal-Priest of Santa Maria in Trastevere, with Giovanni Battista Visconti Aicardi, Bishop of Novara, and Fernando Manuel de Mejia, Bishop of Zamora, serving as co-consecrators. 
On 1 June 1699, he was appointed during the papacy of Pope Innocent XII as Bishop of Lerida.
He served as Bishop of Lerida until his death on 15 December 1700.

While bishop, he was the principal co-consecrator of José Llinás y Aznar, Bishop of Barcelona (1695), and Jeronimo López, Bishop of Gerona (1696).

References

External links and additional sources
 (for Chronology of Bishops) 
 (for Chronology of Bishops) 
 (for Chronology of Bishops) 
 (for Chronology of Bishops) 

17th-century Roman Catholic bishops in Spain
Bishops appointed by Pope Innocent XII
1643 births
1700 deaths
Franciscan bishops
Bishops of Lleida